John Richard Wilson (born 2 August 1965) is a British journalist and broadcaster. He is the son of Bob Wilson, former Arsenal goalkeeper and television sports presenter.

Life and career 
John Wilson was born in London in 1965. He attended Chancellor's School in Hertfordshire and studied at the then Dorset Institute of Higher Education, gaining a BA (Hons) in English and Media awarded by the University of Southampton in 1988. He worked as a reporter on local newspapers in north London before beginning his radio career in 1990, presenting and reporting for the BBC Radio Five magazine show The Mix.  He has presented numerous programmes and series on BBC Radio 4 including The Sports Programme, The Cultural State, The Fixers, Kaleidoscope, Stealing Beauty and Pick of The Week. He has also made features and documentaries for Radio One and Five Live and has written about art and cultural issues for publications including The Observer and The Art Newspaper.

John Wilson is one of the regular presenters of Front Row, the Radio 4 arts programme. He specialises in music-related interviews for the programme and has interviewed artists such as Morrissey, David Bowie, Elton John, Paul McCartney, Quincy Jones, Noel Gallagher, Bernie Taupin, Kate Bush, Ray Davies, Peter Gabriel and Noddy Holder. From 2012 he has presented his own dedicated music programme on Radio 4 called Mastertapes, where musicians are invited to discuss a career-defining album in front of a live audience. Guests have included Wilko Johnson and Richard Thompson.

He is co-author with his brother, photographer Robert Wilson, of One: Images of a Goalkeeping Season (1996, Boxtree Ltd). In 1995/96 he also edited the pioneering internet magazine Trigger.co.uk.

References

1965 births
Living people
Alumni of the University of Southampton
British male journalists
People from London